BRJ may refer to:
Bombardier CSeries
Bourj FC, a Lebanese association football club
Bureau de renseignements judiciaires